Beijing  Hongdeng (Simplified Chinese: 北京宏登) is defunct Chinese football club, which was located in Beijing, China. The club was founded in the 1997 and was taken over by Beijing Baxy F.C. at the beginning of the 2010 league season.

Name history
1997–2002 Beijing Longli 北京龙力
2003–2010 Beijing Hongdeng 北京宏登

Results
As of the end of 2009 season

All-time League Rankings

 in 2nd phase group stage
 in North League

References

Defunct football clubs in China
Defunct football clubs in Beijing
Association football clubs established in 1997
Association football clubs disestablished in 2010
1997 establishments in China
2010 disestablishments in China